Armin Abron (born October 24, 1975 in Frankfurt, Germany) is a Periodontist, who practices in Washington, DC. He is also an adjunct Assistant Professor of Periodontology at UNC School of Dentistry in Chapel Hill.

Abron earned his Bachelor of Science degree (B.S.) and Doctor of Dental Surgery degree (D.D.S.) from the University of North Carolina at Chapel Hill, and his Masters of Science degree (M.S.) in Periodontology at Columbia University School of Dental and Oral Surgery in New York City.

He is the recipient of the Mel Morris Award for Clinical and Academic Excellence in Periodontics.

Abron has been involved in many research projects related to Implants and Periodontology. His work has been published in national and international journals, including the European Journal of Oral Science, Journal of Prosthetic Dentistry, and Journal of Clinical Periodontology.

References

External links 

 DC Perio and Implants 
 Armin Abron

1975 births
Living people
21st-century American dentists
American dentistry academics